Flagging may refer to:

Running out of time on a chess clock
Flagging (tape), a colored non-adhesive tape used in marking objects
Flagging (shipping) of a merchant vessel under the laws of a flag state
The activities of a flagger (disambiguation)
Handkerchief code, a use of color-coded bandannas in the gay and BDSM communities
Flagging (botany), a growth pattern that reduces or eliminates growth on one side of a tree or other plant
Flagging (climbing), a rock climbing technique

See also
Flag (disambiguation)